The DP World Tour Championship is a golf tournament on the European Tour and is the climax of the DP World Tour Rankings. It is contested on the Greg Norman-designed Earth course at the Jumeirah Golf Estates in Dubai, United Arab Emirates. The title sponsor is DP World, based in Dubai.

The tournament was first held in 2009 when the Order of Merit was replaced by the Race to Dubai. It is contested by the leading 50 players in the DP World Tour Rankings at the start of the tournament. It is the replacement for the Volvo Masters, which was a similar event for the leading 60 money winners on the Order of Merit. 

Past winners include Matt Fitzpatrick, Rory McIlroy, Jon Rahm and Henrik Stenson.  

The prize fund was increased to US$8,000,000 in 2012 and then US$9,000,000 in 2021 when the European Tour announced the new title sponsorship with DP World Tour. 

The tournament also determines the Race to Dubai Bonus Pool, which goes to the top golfers on the DP World Tour Rankings after the tournament. It was original set at US$10,000,000 but reduced to US$7,500,000 paid to the top 15 players with the Race to Dubai winner getting US$1,500,000. In 2012 the bonus pool was cut in half to US$3,750,000 and reduced to the top 10 golfers, with the winner getting US$1,000,000.

The 2013 DP World Tour Championship at Jumeirah Golf Estates delivered a US$44 million gross economic benefit to Dubai, according to independent research commissioned by tournament organisers, The European Tour as stated in Vision magazine.

Final Series and Rolex Series
In 2013 the European Tour introduced the Final Series, a four tournament end of season series of tournaments consisting of the Turkish Airlines Open, WGC-HSBC Champions, BMW Masters, and culminating in the DP World Tour Championship. In 2016 the series was reduced to three tournaments with the removal of the WGC-HSBC Champions and BMW Masters, and the addition of the Nedbank Golf Challenge.

In 2017 the Rolex Series was launched, which is a series of tournaments with higher prize funds than regular tour events and included the three Final Series tournaments. In 2022, there are five Rolex Series tournaments, three of which are in the United Arab Emirates.

Winners

References

External links 

Coverage on the European Tour's official site

European Tour events
Golf tournaments in the United Arab Emirates
Sports competitions in Dubai
Recurring sporting events established in 2009
2009 establishments in the United Arab Emirates
Autumn events in the United Arab Emirates